Natnael Zeleke Tadesse (Amharic: ናትናኤል ዘለቀ; born 30 April 1995) is an Ethiopian professional footballer who plays as a midfielder for Ethiopian Premier League club Saint George.

International career
In August 2014, coach Mariano Barreto, invited him to be a part of the Ethiopia squad for the 2015 Africa Cup of Nations qualification.

References

Living people
Ethiopian footballers
Ethiopia A' international footballers
2014 African Nations Championship players
1986 births
Place of birth missing (living people)
Saint George S.C. players
Association football midfielders
Ethiopia international footballers